Franck M'bia Etoundi (born 30 August 1990) is a Cameroonian professional footballer who plays as a striker for Luxembourg National Division club UN Käerjéng 97. At international level, he made eleven appearances for the Cameroon national team scoring once.

Career
Born in Douala, Etoundi began his career 2004 with Dragons Yaoundé and joined 2009 to Ouragan FC de Biyem Assi.

In September 2009, Etoundi left his club Ouragan FC to sign his first professional contract in Europe for Neuchâtel Xamax, earning his first professional cap in the Swiss Super League on 14 February 2010 against FC Basel. On 27 April 2010, Neuchâtel Xamax confirmed his expiring contract would not renewed and he could leave the club.

On 17 May 2010, he began a trial with the Swiss club FC Biel-Bienne and signed a contract with the Swiss Challenge League team three days later.

In 2011–2012 Etoundi signed a new contract with FC St. Gallen until 2013 with an option for an additional year.

After  years in Turkey, he left Boluspor in December 2018 and signed a six-month contract in January 2019 with Sochaux in France.

Following the expiration of his contract with Sochaux, Etoundi was a free player, until he signed on 10 December 2019 with the Croatian side Slaven Belupo.

Personal life
Franck is the younger brother of Stéphane Mbia.

Career statistics
Scores and results list Cameroon's goal tally first.

Honours
St. Gallen
Swiss Challenge League: 2011–12

FC Zürich
Swiss Cup: 2013–14

References

External links
 
 

Living people
1990 births
Cameroonian footballers
Footballers from Douala
Association football forwards
Cameroon international footballers
2015 Africa Cup of Nations players
Swiss Super League players
Swiss Challenge League players
Süper Lig players
Ligue 2 players
Championnat National 2 players
Croatian Football League players
Luxembourg National Division players
Neuchâtel Xamax FCS players
FC Biel-Bienne players
FC St. Gallen players
FC Zürich players
Kasımpaşa S.K. footballers
Boluspor footballers
FC Sochaux-Montbéliard players
NK Slaven Belupo players
AS Vitré players
UN Käerjéng 97 players
Cameroonian expatriate footballers
Cameroonian expatriate sportspeople in Switzerland
Expatriate footballers in Switzerland
Cameroonian expatriate sportspeople in Turkey
Expatriate footballers in Turkey
Cameroonian expatriate sportspeople in Croatia
Expatriate footballers in Croatia
Cameroonian expatriate sportspeople in France
Expatriate footballers in France
Cameroonian expatriate sportspeople in Luxembourg
Expatriate footballers in Luxembourg